Tom Dooney (born 3 August 1939) is a New Zealand sprint canoeist who competed in the early 1970s. He was eliminated in the repechages of K-2 1000 m event at the 1972 Summer Olympics in Munich.

References 
 Black Gold by Ron Palenski (2008, 2004 New Zealand Sports Hall of Fame, Dunedin) p. 35

External links 
 
 

1939 births
Canoeists at the 1972 Summer Olympics
Living people
New Zealand male canoeists
Olympic canoeists of New Zealand